Emmanuela Beltrán Rahola (21 November  1946 – 11 July 2016) better known as Emma Cohen was a Spanish actress, director, producer, and writer. She appeared in many Spanish language films. She portrayed Gallina Caponata in Barrio Sésamo, a counterpart to Big Bird in the Spanish version of Sesame Street.

Personal life
Emma Cohen was married to actor Fernando Fernán Gómez until his death in 2007. She died on 11 July 2016, aged 69, after a battle with cancer.

Selected filmography
 Tuset Street (1967)
 El extraño caso del doctor Fausto (1969)
 Hembra/ Female (1970)
 Growing Leg, Diminishing Skirt (1970)
 The Man Who Wanted to Kill Himself (1970)
 The Glass Ceiling (1971) an Italian giallo
 Spaniards in Paris (1971)
 The Legend of Frenchie King (1971)
 Trop jolies pour être honnêtes (1972)
 The Cannibal Man (1972) directed by Eloy de la Iglesia
 Horror Rises from the Tomb (1973) directed by Paul Naschy
 The Other Side of the Mirror (1973) directed by Jesus Franco
 Cry, Onion! (1975)
 La cruz del diablo (1975) directed by John Gilling
 The Strange Love of the Vampires (1975) directed by Leon Klimovsky

References

External links
 

1946 births
2016 deaths
Spanish film actresses
Spanish women film directors
Actresses from Barcelona
Deaths from cancer in Spain
Spanish women screenwriters
20th-century Spanish actresses